The End Records is a record label in Manhattan that specializes in rock, heavy metal, indie, and electronic music.

Active Roster
  American Sharks
  Anathema
  Andy Winter
  Anvil
  Arthur Channel
  Art Brut
  AxeWound
  Bad Powers
  Badly Drawn Boy
  Bereft
  Better Than Ezra
  British Electronic Foundation
  Cage The Gods
  The Candles
  Chantal Claret
  Charm City Devils
  Cosmo Jarvis
  Cradle Of Filth
  Crossfaith
  The Dandy Warhols
  Daniel Lioneye
  Danzig
  Dir En Grey
  Eklipse
  Everclear
  Emilie Autumn
  Fatboy Slim
  FEAR
  Funeral For A Friend
  Goes Cube
  Hatchet
  Helloween
  Hey! Hello!
  HIM
  Hull
  James Iha
  Juliette Lewis
  Krokus
  The Lemonheads
  Lordi
  LostAlone
  Mekon
  Michelle Chamuel
  Mindless Self Indulgence
  The Mission
  My Jerusalem
  Nadja
  Neil Davidge
  Nina Persson
  Novembers Doom
  Okta Logue
  One Model Nation
  OOMPH!
  The Orb
  Paradise Lost
  Petula Clark
  The Prodigy
  Pushmen
  The Rasmus
  The Red Paintings
  Rich Robinson
  Sacred Mother Tongue
  Scott Lucas & The Married Men
  Sleepy Sun
  Spirits Of The Dead
  Sponge
  These Are They
  Today Is the Day
  Too Late The Hero
  Virgin Black
  While She Sleeps
  Winds
  Wanz

Past roster
  The 69 Eyes
  After Forever
   Agalloch
  Age of Silence
  Agua de Annique
  Amoral
   The Answer
  Antimatter
  Arcturus
  Audio Bullys
  Braveyoung
  Cable
  The Charlatans
  Crisis
  Darkthrone
  Die Apokalyptischen Reiter
  Dirty Little Rabbits
  Dissection
  Does It Offend You, Yeah?
  Early Man
  Enemy of the Sun
  Enslaved
  Estradasphere
  Epica
  Epoch of Unlight
  Frantic Bleep
  Freshkills
  The Gathering
  Giant Squid
  Gorgeous Frankenstein
  Green Carnation
   Head Control System
  Hung
  The Humans
  In the Woods...
  Jarboe
  Karl Sanders
  Karmakanic
  Kosmos
   Laethora
  Lilitu
  Love History
  Made Out of Babies
  Madder Mortem
  Mechanical Poet
  Mental Home
  Mistigo Varggoth Darkestra
  Nightingale
  Nokturnal Mortum
  Oathean
  Odes of Ecstasy
  Peccatum
  Reverend And The Makers
  Scholomance
  Sculptured
  Sigh
  Sleepless
  Sleepytime Gorilla Museum
  Star of Ash
  Stolen Babies
  Subterranean Masquerade
  Suicide City
  Super 8 Bit Brothers
  Sweethead
  Tarja Turunen
  Thine Eyes Bleed
  Tub Ring
  Ulver 
  Unexpect
  Voivod

See also
 The End Records

External links
The End Records roster
The End Records Official Website

End Records